George Styles may refer to:

George Styles (British Army officer) (1928–2006), British Army officer and bomb disposal expert
George Styles (footballer) (1904–1984), Australian rules footballer

See also
George Stiles (disambiguation)